George Santos may refer to:

People 

 George W. Santos (1909–2001), American medical school professor
 George (footballer, born 1986), or George Santos Silva, Brazilian footballer
 George Santos (b. 1988), member of the U.S. House of Representatives

See also 

 Georges Santos (b. 1970), English footballer
 George (footballer, born 1978), or George dos Santos Paladini, Brazilian footballer